Guthrie County is a county located in the U.S. state of Iowa. As of the 2020 census, the population was 10,623. The county seat is Guthrie Center. The county was formed on January 15, 1851, and named after Captain Edwin B. Guthrie, who died in the Mexican–American War.

Guthrie County is one of the six counties that make up the Des Moines–West Des Moines, IA Metropolitan Statistical Area.

Geography

  
Example of native vegetation: https://commons.wikimedia.org/wiki/File:Whiterock_Conservancy_Neighborhood_New_Wiki_Version.JPG

Major highways
 Iowa Highway 4
 Iowa Highway 25
 Iowa Highway 44
 Iowa Highway 141

Adjacent counties
Greene County  (north)
Dallas County  (east)
Adair County  (south)
Audubon County  (west)
Carroll County  (northwest)

Demographics

2020 census
There were 5,773 housing units, of which 4,529 were occupied.

2010 census
There were 5,756 housing units, of which 4,544 were occupied.

2000 census

At the 2000 census there were 11,353 people, 4,641 households, and 3,248 families in the county.  The population density was 19 people per square mile (7/km2).  There were 5,467 housing units at an average density of 9 per square mile (4/km2).  The racial makeup of the county was 98.61% White, 0.12% Black or African American, 0.05% Native American, 0.14% Asian, 0.04% Pacific Islander, 0.42% from other races, and 0.61% from two or more races.  1.06%. were Hispanic or Latino of any race.

Of the 4,641 households 27.90% had children under the age of 18 living with them, 60.00% were married couples living together, 6.60% had a female householder with no husband present, and 30.00% were non-families. 26.10% of households were one person and 14.10% were one person aged 65 or older.  The average household size was 2.39 and the average family size was 2.86.

The age distribution was 23.60% under the age of 18, 6.30% from 18 to 24, 24.80% from 25 to 44, 24.90% from 45 to 64, and 20.50% 65 or older.  The median age was 42 years. For every 100 females, there were 97.60 males.  For every 100 females age 18 and over, there were 94.30 males.

The median household income was $36,495 and the median family income  was $43,601. Males had a median income of $31,018 versus $22,077 for females. The per capita income for the county was $19,726.  About 5.80% of families and 8.00% of the population were below the poverty line, including 8.90% of those under age 18 and 8.10% of those age 65 or over.

Communities

Cities

Adair
Bagley
Bayard
Casey
Coon Rapids
Guthrie Center
Jamaica
Menlo
Panora
Stuart
Yale

Townships

Baker Township
Bear Grove Township
Beaver Township
Cass Township
Dodge Township
Grant Township
Highland Township
Jackson Township
Orange Township
Penn Township
Richland Township
Seely Township
Stuart Township
Thompson Township
Union Township
Valley Township
Victory Township

Unincorporated Communities

Dale City
Diamondhead Lake
Glendon
Herndon
Monteith
Morrisburg

Census-designated places
Lake Panorama

Population ranking
The population ranking of the following table is based on the 2020 census of Guthrie County.

† county seat

Politics

See also

National Register of Historic Places listings in Guthrie County, Iowa
Raccoon River Valley Trail
Springbrook State Park

References

External links

County website

 
1851 establishments in Iowa
Des Moines metropolitan area
Populated places established in 1851